Hank Chen (born November 1, 1989) is an American actor and comedian best known for Life-Size 2 and Robin Williams's final theatrical release, The Angriest Man in Brooklyn.

Early life
Born as Henry Chen in Silver Spring, Maryland, to Taiwanese immigrants, Chen spoke Mandarin Chinese at home before learning English. His parents are software engineers and he has a younger sister.

Chen grew up in a religious and conservative household. He is an original co-founder and board member of advocacy group, OneWheaton supporting LGBT students and alumni from his alma mater.

Raised in the suburbs of Washington, D.C., Chen graduated with an International Baccalaureate diploma from Springbrook High School. At Wheaton College, he majored in Sociology with minors in Communications and English, and studied theatre at the University of Westminster in London. Chen remained near Chicago after college graduation to work, take acting classes, and perform stand-up comedy. He trained with The Second City, Steppenwolf Theatre Company, and joined Stir Friday Night, a sketch comedy ensemble of Asian-American performers. Other SFN alumni include Danny Pudi and Steven Yeun. Chen was accepted into the Actors Studio Drama School at Pace University MFA program and moved to Brooklyn, New York, where he began his career with a credit on Law & Order: Special Victims Unit.

Career
Chen has appeared on television since 2011 with credits including Blue Bloods, Lopez, and Transparent. He made his film debut in The Angriest Man in Brooklyn, followed up by roles in Reese Witherspoon-starrer Home Again, and Janicza Bravo's first full length feature, Lemon.

In 2018, Chen co-starred in Freeform's Life-Size 2 opposite Tyra Banks and Francia Raisa.

Filmography

Film

Television

References

External links

 Hank Chen on Twitter
 Hank Chen on Instagram
 Hank Chen on Facebook

1989 births
Living people
American male comedians
American male film actors
American male television actors
American male voice actors
American male web series actors
21st-century American male actors
American LGBT people of Asian descent
Gay comedians
American gay actors
American LGBT rights activists
LGBT people from Maryland
21st-century American comedians
American male actors of Chinese descent
American male actors of Taiwanese descent
American LGBT comedians